Balhindhu is an upcoming Maldivian horror film directed by Ahmed Sinan. Produced by Mohamed Ali and Aishath Fuad Thaufeeq under Dark Rain Entertainment, the film stars Ali Azim, Aminath Rashfa, Mariyam Majudha, Nuzuhath Shuaib, Sharaf Abdulla and Ismail Jumaih.

Cast 
 Ali Azim
 Aminath Rashfa
 Mariyam Majudha
 Nuzuhath Shuaib
 Sharaf Abdulla
 Ismail Jumaih
 Hunaisha Adam Naseer
 Aisha Ali
 Fathimath Latheefa
 Mariyam Shakeela
 Mohamed Mazin

Development
Following the success of Goh Raalhu (2019), in September 2019, Dark Rain Entertainment announced the project Balhindhu, third-direction of Ahmed Sinan. The cast of the film were initially finalized to be Aminath Rashfa, Mohamed Jumayyil, Fathimath Sara Adam, Mohamed Yunaan, Ismail Jumaih and Hunaisha Adam Naseer. However, following the child abuse allegation over Jumayyil, Dark Rain Entertainment severed ties with him and re-shoot the majority of the scenes with some changes in the cast. In September 2020, it was reported that Ali Azim will replace Jumayyil in the film and announced that Mariyam Majudha, Nuzuhath Shuaib and Sharaf Abdulla will join the cast while Fathimath Sara Adam and Mohamed Yunaan will no longer star in the film. On 9 October 2020, the first look of the character played by Mariyam Shakeela which caught the attention of media and was praised for the Prosthetic makeup and cinematography.

References

Maldivian horror films
Upcoming films
Films directed by Ahmed Sinan